Decade of Bravehearts is the eighth and final studio album by Japanese novelty heavy metal band Animetal, released through VAP on August 2, 2006. Commemorating the band's 10th anniversary, the album features full length covers of various anime and tokusatsu songs that they have covered on their other albums, plus their covers of the themes from the 2002 Super Sentai series Ninpuu Sentai Hurricaneger and the 2003 anime series Godannar. Also included in the album is a bonus DVD.

The album peaked at No. 110 on Oricon's weekly albums chart.

Track listing
All tracks are arranged by Animetal.

Personnel
 - Lead vocals
Syu - Guitar
Masaki - Bass

with

Katsuji - Drums
 - Drums

Charts

Footnotes

References

External links

2006 albums
Animetal albums
Japanese-language albums
Covers albums